The 1938 European Wrestling Championships were held in 24–27 April 1938 Tallinn, Estonia in the building of the Estonia Theater. The competitions were held only in Greco-Roman wrestling. 72 athletes from 13 countries took part in 7 weight categories.

Medal table

Medal summary

Men's Greco-Roman

References

External links
FILA Database

1938 in Estonian sport

1938 in European sport
Sports competitions in Tallinn